Fraser Armstrong (born 18 April 1992) is a New Zealand rugby union player who currently plays as a prop for  in New Zealand's domestic Mitre 10 Cup.

Early career

Armstrong attended Hamilton Boys' High School and during that time played first XV rugby for them as well as making his way through the age grades with his local province, .

Senior career

He was first named in 's squad ahead of the 2012 ITM Cup, however he didn't make any appearances and had to wait until the following year before making his senior debut.   With game time severely limited in Waikato, he shifted north and joined  in 2014.   Again he found his chances limited there, making just 1 appearance before being loaned to the Manawatu Turbos in 2015.   The Turbos were in need of new props due to injuries to Ma'afu Fia and Chris Eves and this allowed Armstrong to become a regular in their side.   He made 9 appearances, 5 of which were from the start and scored 1 try in 2015 and followed that up with 8 appearances the following year.

International

Armstrong was a New Zealand Schoolboys representative in 2010 and was also a member of the New Zealand Under 20 side which finished as runner-up in the 2012 IRB Junior World Championship in South Africa.

References

1992 births
Living people
New Zealand rugby union players
Rugby union props
Manawatu rugby union players
Auckland rugby union players
Waikato rugby union players
People educated at Hamilton Boys' High School
People from Te Awamutu
Hurricanes (rugby union) players
Wellington rugby union players
Rugby union players from Waikato